Channel 32 refers to several television stations:

Canada
The following television stations operate on virtual channel 32 in Canada:
 CICO-DT-32 in Windsor, Ontario
 CIVK-DT-1 in Gascons, Quebec
 CIVT-DT in Vancouver, British Columbia
 CKCS-DT in Calgary, Alberta

Mexico
The following television station operates on virtual channel 32 in Mexico:
 XHJCI-TDT in Ciudad Juárez, Chihuahua

See also
 Channel 32 virtual TV stations in the United States
For UHF frequencies covering 579.25-583.75 MHz
 Channel 32 TV stations in Canada
 Channel 32 TV stations in Mexico
 Channel 32 digital TV stations in the United States
 Channel 32 low-power TV stations in the United States

32